John Cowdin may refer to:
 John Elliot Cowdin, American polo player
 John Cheever Cowdin, his son, American financier and polo player